Weavers is a historical locality of Sydney, in the state of New South Wales, Australia. It is located in the City of Hawkesbury east of Leets Vale.

Suburbs of Sydney
City of Hawkesbury